Tanjung Selor is the capital of both the North Kalimantan province in Indonesia, and of the Bulungan Regency. It is among provincial capitals in Indonesia that as of 2021 does not yet have city status, together with Mamuju in West Sulawesi, Sofifi in North Maluku, Nabire in Central Papua, Wamena in Highland Papua, Merauke in South Papua, and Manokwari in West Papua. The district has an area of 677.77 km2 and had a population of 39,439 at the 2010 Census  and 56,569 at the 2020 Census.

History 
Tanjung Selor was a small market town under the Sultanate of Bulungan, which later became the subject of the Dutch East Indies. After the Indonesian National Revolution, it became part of the Swapraja (Autonomous Royal Region) of Bulungan following Decree No. 186/ORB/ 92/14/1950 from the then-Kalimantan province governor. This later changed again into the Special Region of Bulungan under Law No. 22 of 1955. In 1959, the sultanate was abolished and became a second-level administrative region, now called a regency.

Tanjung Selor was split from Tanjung Palas District, based on Bulungan Regency Law No. 13 of 2002, together with other seven new districts after the decentralization. Before the creation of the new North Kalimantan province split from East Kalimantan, it was determined to locate the provincial capital on mainland Kalimantan rather than  the in the then-largest provincial city of Tarakan, which is an island. As such, Tanjung Selor is among few Indonesian provincial capitals to be created from scratch, along with Sofifi and Palangka Raya. However, for financial reasons a moratorium under President Joko Widodo on creating second-level administrations so far has prevented granting Tanjung Selor city status. As of 2022, North Kalimantan remains among few of Indonesian provinces with its capital not having city status.

Geography
The district is mostly a flat, low-lying region with hills whose height varies from 0 to 500 meters above sea level. Borders of The district borders Central Tanjung Palas District in the north, East Tanjung Palas District in the east and the south, and Kayan river in the west. Soil in the district is acidic, with a pH range between 4 and 6. Another river, the Selor, also runs through the district.

Climate 
Tanjung Selor has a tropical rainforest climate (Köppen Af) with heavy rainfall year-round.

Economy 
Agricultural land use includes chilis, tomatoes, ginger, galangal, and turmeric. Chili production was 337 tons in 2019, with 295 tons of tomatoes, 57 tons of ginger, 52 tons of galangal, and four tons of turmeric. The district also includes plantation sectors which produce mangoes, citrus, durian, and bananas. There are 68 registered restaurants in the district as of 2019 and 12 convenience stores. There also are 11 hotels as of 2019. Twelve banks operate in the district, of which nine are branches of state-owned banks, two are private banks, and one, the People's Credit Bank, is a  municipally-owned BPR. There also are 45 registered cooperatives.

Governance 

As a district, it is a third-level administrative region under a regency. A district head(camat) is appointed directly by the regent with recommendation from the regency secretary. Tanjung Selor itself has no parliament. The district is divided into nine urban villages (kelurahan).

 Gunung Seriang
 Tanjung Selor Hulu
 Jelarai Selor
 Gunung Sari
 Bumi Rahayu
 Apung
 Tengkapak
 East Tanjung Selor
 Tanjung Selor Hilir

At the regency level, the district, together with East Tanjung Palas, is part of the Bulungan first electoral district, which sends 11 representatives to the regency-level parliament. The latest election was in 2019, and the next is expected in 2024.

Infrastructure 

The district is served by the Tanjung Harapan Airport. All roads in the district are asphalt-paved and in good condition as of 2020, according to Statistics Indonesia. As of 2019, the district has 35 elementary schools, 19 junior high schools, 10 senior high schools, three vocational high schools, and three higher education institutions. There is also one hospital, 11 puskesmas government health clinics, three additional clinics, seven healthcare centers, and 17 pharmacies. Most of the district is reached by 4G wireless signal and basic telecommunication services. The district's hospital, Dr. H. Soemarno Sosroatmojo Regional Hospital, is a public hospital owned by the regency government; built in 1984, it is classified as a C-class hospital by the Ministry of Health.

References

External links 

  Bulungan Regency Official Website

Districts of North Kalimantan
Provincial capitals in Indonesia
Regency seats of North Kalimantan
Bulungan Regency